Kingsmead is an electoral ward within Bath, England, which encompasses most of Bath city centre and stretches west along the A4 to meet Newbridge and Weston wards. The ward elects two councillors to the Bath and North East Somerset unitary authority.

Kingsmead is rarely used as the name of an area of Bath, and is primarily used for electoral purposes. The ward stretches about  westward from Bath city centre, straddling the A4 road north of the River Avon. The ward is separated by the large Royal Victoria Park into a city centre eastern end, and a western residential end known as Lower Weston.

A boundary review in 2018, which came into force at the May 2019 local elections, abolished Abbey ward and extended Kingsmead eastwards as far as the Avon to include most of the city centre. At the same time the ward's western extent was slightly reduced, in order to move the Chelsea Road shopping street wholly into Newbridge ward.

Residents in the western end of the ward often use the facilities, such as schools, of the neighbouring Newbridge and Weston wards, and associate themselves with these localities.

The closed Mangotsfield and Bath Branch Line formerly ran from Green Park station, now a shopping area, in the ward. The Bristol & Bath Railway Path runs through the ward, but on the River Avon path rather than the former railway track which has been developed upon just south of the ward.

The electoral wards surrounding the ward are: Newbridge to the west, Weston and Lansdown to the north, Walcot and Bathwick to the east, and Widcombe & Lyncombe, Oldfield Park and Westmoreland to the south over the River Avon.

Notable places
Notable places within the ward, from east to west, include:
SouthGate shopping centre
Guildhall
Bath Abbey
Roman Baths
Theatre Royal
Kingsmead Square
Queen Square
Bath Royal Literary and Scientific Institution
Circus
Herschel Museum of Astronomy
Royal Crescent
Norfolk Crescent
Royal Victoria Park and Botanical Gardens

References

External links
Ward Profile - Kingsmead, Bath and North East Somerset

Areas of Bath, Somerset
Electoral wards in Bath and North East Somerset